Solidarity Party may refer to:

American Solidarity Party, Christian democratic political party in the United States
Homeland Solidarity Party, political party in Sabah, Malaysia
Illinois Solidarity Party, American political party in the state of Illinois
Indonesian Solidarity Party, political party in Indonesia
Malaysian Solidarity Party, political party in Malaysia
Solidarity Party (Egypt), Egyptian Islamist party 
Solidarity Party (Lebanon), Lebanese political party 
Solidarity Party (Panama), political party in Panama
Solidarity Party (Thailand), Thai political party that existed from 1983–2002
Solidarity Party of Afghanistan, political party in Afghanistan
Solidarity Party (Armenia), political party in Armenia

See also
Solidarity (disambiguation)